Genoa cake (or simply genoa) is a fruit cake consisting of sultanas (golden-colored raisins), currants or raisins, glacé cherries, almonds, and candied orange peel or essence, cooked in a batter of flour, eggs, butter and sugar.

Origins
Although the name Genoa cake is mainly used in the UK, where recipes for it have been around since the 19th century, it is a variant of the pandolce cake which originated in 16th-century Genoa as a Christmas cake. Unlike Genoa cake, traditional pandolce includes pine nuts as a major ingredient and uses yeast as its raising agent, which requires several hours to rise, like bread.

The term Genoa cake is also sometimes used to refer to two other Genoa-related cakes, neither of which are fruit cakes: génoise cake, a light sponge cake, and pain de Gênes ('Genoa bread'), a dense almond cake.

See also
 Génoise cake (Italian sponge cake)
 Pain de Gênes (ground almond cake)
 Cuisine of Liguria
 List of Italian dishes

References

Italian cakes
Cuisine of Liguria
Christmas cakes